The Megunticook River is a short river in Camden, Maine. 
The upper part of the river has raised water levels due to the Seabright dam. Below the dam the river runs as a mill stream into Camden village. In 2016 the Camden select board was alerted to low water levels above Seabright. It is considering grouting cracks in the rocks supporting the dam to address the problem.

See also
List of rivers of Maine

References

Maine Streamflow Data from the USGS
Maine Watershed Data From Environmental Protection Agency
Funds to fix Seabright Dam discussed for next year's budget

Penobscot Bay
Rivers of Knox County, Maine
Rivers of Maine